Suzan may refer to:

 Suzan, Iran (disambiguation), several villages in Iran
 Suzan, France
 The Suzan, a Japanese pop rock band

See also 

Susan (given name)